The marriage bed of Henry VII (also known as the Paradise Bed) is a carved oak four-post bedstead bought in a dilapidated condition at an auction in Chester, England, in 2010. Since then it has received considerable publicity in various media and is claimed by its supporters to be the bed designed and built for use on the night of King Henry VII's  marriage to Elizabeth of York on 18 January 1486. The marriage symbolised the end of the War of the Roses by joining Henry's House of Lancaster to Elizabeth's House of York and the bed's design reflected this featuring both the White Rose of York and the Red Rose of Lancaster. A carving on the headboard depicted the Royal couple as either Adam and Eve or Christ and the Virgin Mary defeating the animals that opposed Christ in Psalm 91 and bringing paradise to England (hence the bed's alternative name). The bed also includes the arms of France, reflecting Henry's possessions and ambitions there, as well as religious and fertility symbols.

The bed is thought to have been gifted to Henry's stepfather, Thomas Stanley, in 1495 and remained in use by the Stanley family for a hundred years. It then vanishes from the historic record, surviving the wide-scale destruction of Royal furniture during the English Civil War, before reappearing in 1842 when copies of it were made but its true significance remained unknown. The bed was later used in the honeymoon suite of the Redland House Hotel in Chester. It was rediscovered after being sold at auction for £2,200 in 2010 when the hotel was redeveloped. The bed's purchaser, Ian Coulson, spent nine years carrying out research and tests on the bed which proved its Tudor provenance. The bed, which is now valued at £20 million, is held in Coulson's Langley Collection and has featured in exhibitions.

Others, however, disagree with the hypothesis outlined above, which has been disseminated mainly by press coverage and has not been submitted to any peer reviewed journal. Since 2010 the bed has been seen by most of the leading furniture specialists in UK museums and auction houses and has failed to convince any of them. They believe it to be the work of the 19th century antiquary, architect and faker George Shaw (1810–76). The text below puts only one side of the argument.

History 

The bed is believed to have been made for the wedding of Henry VII and Elizabeth of York, which took place on 18 January 1486. The marriage symbolised the end of the War of the Roses and joined Elizabeth's House of York with Henry's House of Lancaster, founding the House of Tudor. The marriage bed would have been used on the couple's marriage night and it is believed that their first son Arthur, Prince of Wales (born 19/20 September 1486) was conceived on this occasion. The couple married at Westminster Abbey and the bed stood in the Painted Chamber of the nearby Palace of Westminster, as confirmed by the bed's outline matching the shape of a mural known to have been painted there. The bed may have been influenced by Burgundian designs but archaeologist Jonathan Foyle believes it to have been made in Germany and that Henry himself may have helped to design the bed. The bed is decorated with symbology to support Henry's claim to the throne and the connection between the king and the state as well as religious and fertility symbols.

The bed may have accompanied Henry on his royal progresses about the kingdom. It is possible that the future Henry VIII and Henry and Elizabeth's six subsequent children were conceived in the bed. The bed is believed to have been gifted to Thomas Stanley, Henry's stepfather in 1495, but this could have been another bed commissioned by Henry. It is possible that a similar bed was also commissioned by Henry for his hunting lodge at Knowsley Hall. The bed is thought to have remained in use at Stanley's seat at Lathom House for a century before vanishing from the historical record. During the English Civil War (1642–51) many Royalist possessions were destroyed by Parliamentarian forces, including almost all Royal beds. Henry VII's bed is the only complete bed frame to survive this destruction, the only other Royal bed artefact being a fragment of the headboard of Henry VIII and Anne of Cleves. The bed reappeared in 1842, when it was apparently found by a George Shaw who seems to have sold copies of it without knowing its true significance. Shaw is believed to have kept the front crest of the bed but the remainder ended up at the Redland House Hotel in Chester.

Description 

It is a four-poster bed with each of the posts topped with a carved lion (one of which has lost his tail) each of which holds a shield emblazoned with a rose. The posts support a tester which depicts the tree of life growing from Christ's cross. The frontispiece of the tester shows the arms of England and France quartered. The sides of the tester are formed in the shape of a knotted cord which may reflect Henry's links with the Order of Friars Minor (the Observant Friars). In the centre part of each side holds a shield showing the Cross of Saint George, a particular favourite of Henry's.

The headboard is in the form of a triptych with a central panel showing Henry and Elizabeth flanked by the arms of England and the arms of France, that was originally picked out in expensive ultramarine paint. The carving has been interpreted as an allegory of Adam and Eve and also of Christ and the Virgin Mary working to undo the sins of Adam and Eve and working to turn England into a paradise on Earth. The Royal couple are depicted overcoming the young lion, dragon and snake defeated by Christ in Psalm 91. Due to the connection to the story of Adam and Eve the bed is sometimes referred to as the "Paradise Bed". The inclusion of the arms of France reflect Henry's possessions on the continent and his future ambitions there.

The arms are repeated on the footboard. Other carvings include fertility symbols such as acorns, grapes and strawberries and symbols of the Tudor royalty such as stars, shields, lions and roses. These are similar to carvings in the Henry VII Chapel at Westminster Abbey, dating to 1503–16. The rose carvings on the bed are a mixture of the Red Rose of Lancaster and the White Rose of York which dates it to the early period of Henry's monarchy, before the adoption of the combined Tudor rose.

Rediscovery 

The bed was used by the Redland House Hotel in its honeymoon suite for more than fifteen years. The hotel underwent redevelopment and the bed was at risk of being thrown away before it was spotted by an antique dealer who suggested selling it at auction. The bed was dismantled and for a while lay in the hotel car park before being sold at auction in 2010 to Ian Coulson, an antique bed restorer from Humshaugh, for £2,200.

In the auction sale catalogue the bed was described as a "profusely carved Victorian four poster bed with armorial shields". Coulson spotted that the carvings were made by hand rather than machine and suspected it was of an earlier date. Damage and oxidation of the wood also hinted to a greater age and Coulson spent nine years gathering further evidence to prove the bed's provenance. DNA tests of the wood proved that it all came from a single continental European oak tree, of a type known to have been imported by the English royal family for their beds. Analysis of more than 200 samples of surviving paintwork dated it to the Tudor era.

An announcement of the bed's provenance was made during a symposium at the Victoria & Albert Museum in London. The bed itself featured in the "A Bed Of Roses" exhibition at Hever Castle. Foyle, who carried out research on the bed, described it as "one of the most significant artefacts of early Tudor history" and " the most important piece of furniture in England". The bed is held in Coulson's Langley Collection of historic beds and has been valued at £20 million.

References

External links 
The Langley Collection

Beds
Individual pieces of furniture
English furniture
Early oak furniture
Henry VII of England
15th-century works